Shubhangi Kulkarni (born 19 July 1959) is a former Indian cricketer and one of the game's most successful administrators. She received India's highest sporting honor, the Arjuna Award in 1985. She was the secretary of the Women's Cricket Association of India (WCAI) when WCAI was merged into BCCI in 2006.

She was a leg-spinner and a useful lower order batsman. She represented Maharashtra women's cricket team in women's domestic cricket and made her international debut in India women's cricket team's first women's cricket series against West Indies women's cricket team in 1976.  She bagged a five-wicket haul in the first innings she bowled, a feat she would repeat four more times in the nineteen tests she played in her career.

Shubhangi Kulkarni played in 27 ODIs over 5 international tours:
 1978 Women's Cricket World Cup (2 matches)
 1982 Women's Cricket World Cup (12 matches)
 1983/84 Australia Women in India (4 matches)
 1984/85 New Zealand Women in India (6 matches)
 1986 India Women in England (3 matches)

Kulkarni captained India in three Test match (one against England and two against Australia) as well as one ODI match against England.

After retirement from Test cricket in 1991, she became a cricket administrator and was the secretary of WCAI when WCAI got merged into BCCI in 2006. Currently, she part of ICC Women's Cricket Committee representing Asian Cricket Council.

References 

Living people
1959 births
Maharashtra women cricketers
Recipients of the Arjuna Award
India women One Day International cricketers
India women Test cricketers
Indian cricket administrators
Indian women cricket captains
Indian women cricketers
Cricketers from Pune
Sportswomen from Maharashtra